Francisco Javier García Fernández (born 9 August 1974) is a Spanish martial artist who represented his native country Spain in sport jujitsu. He is the most decorated Spanish jutsuka, a two time World and European champion in discipline fighting systems, -62 kg weight category. He was practising jujitsu mostly at Tres Cantos near Madrid in the Club Katán. He retired from topsport in 2015 after winning second European in Almere title at age of 41.

References

1974 births
Living people
Spanish martial artists
21st-century Spanish people